The Hit Factory is a recording studio in New York City owned and operated by Troy Germano.

History
On March 6, 1975, Edward Germano, a singer, record producer, and one of the principal owners of the Record Plant Studios New York, purchased The Hit Factory from Jerry Ragavoy. At that time The Hit Factory studios were located at 353 West 48th Street and consisted of two studios, A2 and A6. Eventually, a third studio, A5, was added. These studios were active from 1975 to 1981. Germano incorporated The Hit Factory into a business, redesigned its studios, and created the logo it uses to this day. Notable albums from this location include "Songs in the Key of Life" by Stevie Wonder, "One Trick Pony" by Paul Simon, "Station to Station" by David Bowie, "Fear of Music" by Talking Heads, "Voices" by Hall & Oates, "Bat Out of Hell" by Meat Loaf, "Foreigner" by Foreigner (band), "I'm In You" by Peter Frampton, "Live and Sleazy" by Village People, "They Only Come Out At Night" by the Edgar Winter Group, "2" by Peter Gabriel, "Emotional Rescue" by the Rolling Stones, "Double Fantasy" by John Lennon and Yoko Ono.

In 1981, The Hit Factory moved to a new location at 237 West 54th Street, across the street from Studio 54. Dubbed The Hit Factory Broadway, the new location had five studios designed by Germano: A1, A2, A3, M1, and M4—the last of which was later transformed into the first mastering suite for Herb Powers Jr. Germano's son, Troy Germano, started working full-time with him at this location. Albums that were recorded and/or mixed at this location include Graceland by Paul Simon, Born in the U.S.A. by Bruce Springsteen, Undercover by the Rolling Stones, Under a Blood Red Sky by U2, The Rhythm of the Saints by Paul Simon, Live/1975–85 by Bruce Springsteen & the E-Street Band, True Colors by Cyndi Lauper, Whiplash Smile by Billy Idol, Steel Wheels by the Rolling Stones, Long After Dark by Tom Petty and the Heartbreakers, Agent Provocateur by Foreigner, Tunnel of Love by Bruce Springsteen, Riptide by Robert Palmer, Up Your Alley by Joan Jett & the Blackhearts, Forever by Kool & the Gang, Hell Freezes Over by Eagles, August by Eric Clapton, Talk Is Cheap by Keith Richards and Dangerous by Michael Jackson.

In 1987, Germano opened another location, The Hit Factory Times Square, at 130 West 42nd Street. Previously known as Chelsea Sound, the studios were redesigned by Ed and Troy Germano. This facility had two recording studios, Studio C and Studio B, as well as three mastering rooms under the moniker The Hit Factory DMS, for digital mastering studios. The mastering rooms were for engineers Herb Powers Jr., Chris Gehringer, and Tom Coyne. The Times Square recording and mastering studios existed until 1992. Albums of historical importance recorded or mixed at this location include Freedom by Neil Young, Foreign Affair by Tina Turner, Down with the King by Run-DMC, Don't Sweat the Technique by Eric B. & Rakim, and Storm Front by Billy Joel.

In 1991, Ed Germano acquired a 100,000-square-foot building at 421 West 54th Street. It opened in 1993 as simply The Hit Factory.  Ed and Troy designed and built this facility with David Bell, Derek Buckingham, Alan Cundell and Neil Grant of Harris Grant Associates UK. As the main headquarters for The Hit Factory, the studios expanded to seven recording-and-mixing studios (Studios 1–7), five mastering studios (The Hit Factory Mastering) and five private writing-production suites, including rooms for Mark Ronson and Kevin Shirley. Studio 1 was built for orchestral recording that could accommodate up to 140 musicians. In 2002, Troy Germano consolidated the New York City operations into this building. Some of the many  albums recorded or mixed at this facility include "HIStory" by Michael Jackson, "Butterfly" by Mariah Carey, "Let's Talk About Love" by Celine Dion, "Dangerously In Love" by Beyoncé, "CrazySexyCool" by TLC, "Ray Of Light" by Madonna, "No Strings Attached" by NSYNC, "Falling Into You" by Celine Dion, "Daydream" by Mariah Carey, "Ready To Die" by the Notorious B.I.G., the Bodyguard soundtrack by Whitney Houston, "Titanic" soundtrack with Celine Dion,  "Merry Christmas" by Mariah Carey, "Duets" by Frank Sinatra, "My Life" by Mary J.Blige, "Rhythm Of Love" by Anita Baker, "Songs" by Luther Vandross, "The Velvet Rope" by Janet Jackson, "Invincible" by Michael Jackson, "Pop" by U2, Space Jam with Seal, "X&Y" by Coldplay, the broadway cast recording for "Tommy" with Pete Townshend & George Martin, "Music" by Madonna, "River Of Dreams" by Billy Joel and "Sogno" by Andrea Bocelli.

From 1989 to 1993, the company also operated The Hit Factory London. In 1989, Ed and Troy, in a joint venture with Sony Music UK, took control of CBS Studios on Whitfield Street in Soho, London. They redesigned the facility and reopened at the beginning of 1990 with the Rolling Stones working on their album "Flashpoint". Sade recorded her album "Love Deluxe" in Studio 2 and Alison Moyet recorded her album, "Hoodoo" in Studio 3. The studios were designed by Ed, Troy, and the team from Harris Grant Associates UK (David Bell, Derek Buckingham, Alan Cundell & Neil Grant). This facility had three recording studios: Studio 1, Studio 2, and the Rooftop Studio 3, as well as five mastering rooms and hosted many of the artists from that era from Sony Music's  UK labels (primarily Columbia Records & Epic Records). Studio 1 was designed for orchestral recording and could accommodate 100 piece orchestra. The film score for Basic Instinct, by composer Jerry Goldsmith, was recorded here. The Hit Factory London remained through 1993 until the Germano's sold their interests back to Sony Music ending the partnership and retaining
The Hit Factory name and trademark. This facility later became Sony's Whitfield Street Studio.

In 1998, Ed and Troy purchased Criteria Recording in Miami, Florida, revamping and reopening the studios under the new name The Hit Factory Criteria Miami. The studios were designed again by Ed, Troy, and White Mark Limited UK (David Bell, Alan Cundell & Derek Buckingham). The facility had five recording studios—Studio A, Studio C, Studio D, Studio E, and Studio F—a completed mastering room used as a writing and production room for guest producers and artists. In 2012, the Germanos sold the studio as Criteria Recording Studios and retained The Hit Factory name, logo and trademark.

Edward Germano died in 2003 and The Hit Factory closed its main headquarters in 2005. Contrary to reports in the media that the studios in New York City were shuttered due to the advancement of home digital recording, the building at 421 West 54th was sold for estate planning purposes. 

In 2008, Troy Germano, completed Germano Studios in Noho.  Germano Studios changed its name to The Hit Factory in 2023 and is now the only "The Hit Factory" recording studio in the world. Notable albums recorded at this location include "Jose" by J Balvin, "Crosseyed Heart" by Keith Richards, "Beautiful Mind" by Rod Wave, "Astroworld" by Travis Scott, "Hollywood's Bleeding" by Post Malone, "That's What They All Say" by Jack Harlow, "DAMN." by Kendrick Lamar, "Born This Way" by Lady Gaga, "21" by Adele, "Blonde" by Frank Ocean, "Yeezus" by Kanye West, "Uptown Special" by Mark Ronson, "Love in the Future" by John Legend, "Queen" by Nicki Minaj, "Luv Is Rage 2" by Lil Uzi Vert, "Time Clocks" by Joe Bonamassa, "Stronger With Each Tear" by Mary J Blige, "Blues Symphony" by Wynton Marsalis, "Unvarnished" by Joan Jett and the Blackhearts, "My World 2.0" by Justin Bieber, "Beauty Behind the Madness" by the Weeknd, "Anti" by Rihanna, "Prism" by Katy Perry, "4" by Beyoncé, "Memoirs of an Imperfect Angel" by Mariah Carey, "The Blues is Alive and Well" by Buddy Guy, "Girl" by Pharrell Williams and "Clapton" by Eric Clapton.

Locations

The studios occupied several spaces in and around Midtown West, Times Square and Noho. Locations: 

 353 West 48th Street, (The Hit Factory, West 48th Street) 1969–1981
 237 West 54th Street (The Hit Factory Broadway), 1981–2002
 130 West 42nd Street (The Hit Factory Times Square), 1987–1992
 31–37 Whitfield Street (The Hit Factory London), 1989–1993
 1755 NE 149th Street (The Hit Factory Miami), 1998-2012
 421 West 54th Street (The Hit Factory Headquarters), 1992–2005
 676 Broadway (The Hit Factory, Noho), 2008–present

Equipment

1975-1981 
The Hit Factory's original facility at 353 West 48th Street used a mixture of recording equipment. Consoles included a Neve 8068 32 channel console with Necam 1 moving fader automation, a Custom API 32 input console without automation, an MCI JH-500 36 channel console with MCI automation, and an MCI JH-636 36 channel console with MCI automation. Initially, there were a pair of Gonzalez custom analog multi-channel desks. The analog tape machines were Studer A80 24-track 2-inch (wide body) analog recorders, Studer A80 16-track 2-inch (narrow body) analog recorders, Studer A80 2-track 1/4-inch analog recorders and an MCI JH-24 24-track 2-inch analog recorder. The outboard gear was a combination of numerous custom pieces from that period plus Eventide, Neve, Lang, Teletronix, Universal, Pultec, Orban, Kepex, EMT, Fairchild and API. The monitoring was a combination of Westlake, Hidley, Altec, UREI and Auratone. Microphones were Neumann, AKG, Sennheiser, Sony, Norelco, Shure, and Electrovoice. Vocals were recorded primarily with a Neumann U87 or an AKG C414. The studios also had EMT 140 plates, Cooper Time Cubes and Spring reverbs.

1981-2002 
This period saw multiple locations: The Hit Factory Broadway at 237 West 54th Street and The Hit Factory Times Square at 130 West 42nd Street. There were a mixture of desks between the locations as the consoles moved between the seven studios. An MCI JH-636 36 channel console with MCI automation in Studio A2 (moved from West 48th Street). A Neve 8068 32 channel console with Necam 1 moving fader automation, then GML moving faders in Studio A1 & Studio A (moved from West 48th Street). A Custom API 32 input console without automation in Studio A3 (moved from West 48th Street). A pair of Solid State Logic 4000 SL48 E Series 48 channel consoles in Studio A1 & A2, then an additional SSL 4000 SL64 G Series with Ultimation was added to Studio 2. A Solid State Logic 4000 SL64 E Series 64 channel console in Studio M1 and a Solid State Logic 6000 SL72 E Series console in Studio M1. A pair of Neve VR 60 channel consoles in Studio A1, A2 & A3, a Neve VR 36 channel console in Studio A3, a Neve VR 72 channel console in Studio A1, a Neve V Series Vatican 60 channel console in Studio A3, a Neve 8068 40 channel console with Necam II moving fader automation, then GML moving faders in Studio A3 & Studio B, and a Neve 8128 28 channel console in Studio A4. The tape machines were Studer A800 24 track 2 inch analog recorders, Studer A820 24 track 2 inch analog recorders, Studer A827 24 track 2 inch analog recorders, Studer A80 2 track 1/2 inch & 1/4 inch 2 track analog recorders, a Studer A810 2 track 1/4 inch analog recorder, a Studer A80 4 track 1/2 inch analog recorder, and Otari MTR-90 24 track analog recorders. The digital machines were Sony 3324A 24 track 1/2 inch digital recorders with Apogee filters, Mitsubishi X880 32 track 1 inch digital recorders, and Mitsubishi X80 & X86 2 track 1/4 inch digital recorders. The outboard gear was a combination of AMS, Quantek, Eventide, Publison, Lexicon, Universal Audio, Teletronix, Tube-Tech, Pultec, GML, SSL, Neve, API, EMT, Apogee, Focusrite, Manley and Avalon. The monitoring was a combination of UREI, Quested, Tannoy, Augspurger, Yamaha, Auratone, Westlake, Genelec, Meyer, Altec, and David's. The microphones collection included Telefunken, Neumann, Sony, B&K, RCA, Schoeps, Beyer Dynamic, AKG, Sennheiser, Norelco, Electrovoice & Shure.

1993-2005 
These years focus solely on the main headquarters at 421 West 54th Street, just known as The Hit Factory which had seven studios. The consoles consisted of a Neve 8068 72 channel console with Flying Faders in Studio 2 (this was a combination of custom joining of an original Neve 8068 32 and a Neve 8068 40). Also a Neve VR 72 channel console with Flying Faders in Studio 1, a Neve VRSP 72 channel console with Flying Faders in Studio 1, and a Solid State Logic 9000 J Series 9080 80 channel console in Studio 1. A Solid State Logic K Series 9080 80 channel console in Studio 2, a Solid State Logic G+ 4064 64 channel console in Studio 3, and a Solid State Logic J Series 9080 80 channel console in Studio 3. In Studio 4 there was a Solid State Logic 4000 SL96 E Series 96 channel console, followed by a Solid State Logic AXIOM 80 channel digital console in Studio 4, and then a Solid State Logic 9000 J Series 9080 80 channel console. There was a Sony Oxford digital console in Studio 5, followed by a Euphonix System 5 digital console. A Solid State Logic K Series 9080 80 channel console was in Studio 6 and a Solid State Logic K Series 9080 80 channel console was in Studio 7. The analog tape machines were Studer A800 24 track 2 inch analog recorders, Studer A827 24 track 2 inch analog recorders, a Studer A827 16 track 2 inch analog recorder, Studer A820 2 track 1/2 inch analog recorders, and Studer A80 2 track 1/2 inch analog recorders. The digital tape machines were Sony 3348 48 channel 1/2 inch digital recorders, Sony 3348HR 48 channel 1/2 inch digital recorders, Mitsubishi X880 32 track 1 inch digital recorders, Sony PCM-3402 DASH 2 track 1/4 inch digital recorders, and Sony PCM 1630 2 track digital recorders. Digidesign Pro Tools systems were introduced as part of the new hard disk recorders for all of the studios as of 2000. The monitoring systems changed from Boxers to Augspurgers then back to the newest Boxer T5 monitors as well as a selection of Yamaha, Genelec, ProAcs, Auratones, Dynaudio and Mastering Lab for the near field speakers. The outboard gear included AMS, AMS Neve, Lexicon, Eventide, API, Focusrite, SSL, Avalon, Manley, Weiss, Tube-Tech, Pultec, Universal Audio, Teletronix, GML, EMT and Quantek. The microphone collection grew to include Coles, Neumann, Telefunken, Sennheiser, AKG, Schoeps, B&K, Sony, Shure, RCA, Norelco, Beyer Dynamic & Electrovoice.

1989-1993 
The Hit Factory London was located on Whitfield Street in Soho London. There were three studios and the consoles consisted of a Neve VR 72 channel console in Studio 1 for orchestral recording & mixing, a Neve VR 72 channel console in Studio 2 for overdub recording & mixing and a Solid State Logic 4000 SL56 E Series 56 channel console for band recording & mixing. The analog tape machines were Studer A820 & Studer A827 24 track 2 inch analog recorders and Studer A80 2 track 1/2 inch analog recorders. The digital tape machines included Sony 3348 48 channel 1/2 inch digital recorders, and Sony PCM 1630 2 track digital recorders. The monitoring systems were Boxer's as well as Yamaha, Genelec & Auratone near field speakers. The outboard gear was a large selection of AMS, Neve, SSL, GML, Lexicon, EMT, Pultec, Tube-Tech, Teletronix, Universal Audio, Manley, Eventide, API & Focusrite. The microphone collection consisted of Neumann, Telefunken, Sennheiser, AKG, Sony, Shure, Electrovoice, Beyer Dynamic, Coles, B&K.

2008-present 
The Hit Factory in New York's Noho consists of two studios. The consoles are a pair of Solid State Logic Duality Delta 48 channel consoles for recording and mixing in Studio 1 and Studio 2. Both studios are equipped with Avid Pro Tools PT Ultimate 2020.10 HDX3 64/64 systems with the Apple Mac Studio M1 computers and Sonnet expansion racks. There are no longer any tape recorders, analog or digital, available at the studios in 2020. The monitoring systems are custom Exigy S412G monitors with custom dual 18" subwoofers in each of the control rooms. The near field speakers are Amphion One 18 passive monitors, Avantone CLA-10 active monitors, Avantone CLA-10 passive monitors, Yamaha NS-10M Studio passive monitors, Avantone Mix Cube passive & active monitors, KRK Rokit 7 G4 monitors, SONOS monitoring. The outboard gear is an arsenal of selected pieces from Neve, API, Chandler, Retro Instruments, Lavry, Bricasti, AMS, Focusrite, Universal Audio, Tube-Tech, Moog, Heritage Audio, Empirical Labs, Black Lion, SSL. The microphone collection consists of Telefunken, Neumann, Coles, Sennheiser, DPA, Schoeps, AKG, Shure, Mojave, Royer, AEA, Electrovoice, Beyer Dynamic, Avantone & Yamaha.

RIAA Diamond Awards

The Hit Factory was a part of 23 RIAA Diamond Awards for albums and songs that sold 10 million copies in the United States: 
 Stevie Wonder “Songs In The Key Of Life”
 Bruce Springsteen “Born In The USA”
 Whitney Houston "Whitney"
 Celine Dion “Falling Into You”
 TLC “CrazySexyCool”
 Santana “Supernatural”
 Bruce Springsteen & The E Street Band “Live 1975-‘85”
 Whitney Houston “The Bodyguard”
 Billy Joel “Greatest Hits Volume I & Volume II”
 "Titanic” soundtrack
 Meat Loaf “Bat Out Of Hell”
 NSYNC “No Strings Attached”
 Celine Dion “Lets Talk About Love”
 Michael Jackson “Bad”
 Mariah Carey “Daydream”
 Lauryn Hill "The Miseducation of Lauryn Hill"
 Adele "21"
 Travis Scott "Sicko Mode"
 Justin Bieber "Baby"
 John Legend "All Of Me"
 Maroon 5 "Moves Like Jagger"
 Mariah Carey "All I Want For Christmas Is You"
 Whitney Houston "I Will Always Love You"

Album of the Year Grammy Awards

The Hit Factory has nine wins and 32 nominations for Album of the Year:
 1977 "Songs in the Key of Life" Stevie Wonder
 1982 "Double Fantasy" John Lennon and Yoko Ono
 1987 "Graceland" Paul Simon
 1992 "Unforgettable... With Love" Natalie Cole
 1994 "The Bodyguard" Whitney Houston
 1997 "Falling Into You" Celine Dion
 1999 "The Miseducation Of Lauryn Hill" Lauryn Hill
 2000 "Supernatural" Santana
 2012 "21" Adele

Academy Award for Best Original Song

The Hit Factory has three wins and seven nominations for Best Original Song
 1988 Working Girl "Let the River Run" by Carly Simon
 1995 Pocahontas "Colors of the Wind" by Alan Menken and Stephen Schwartz
 1997 Titanic "My Heart Will Go On" by James Horner and Will Jennings (Celine Dion)

John Lennon's last recording session
Public awareness of The Hit Factory increased after the death of John Lennon on December 8, 1980. Lennon had recorded his final album at The Hit Factory at 353 West 48th Street, a fact mentioned in some newspaper accounts of the murder. There are contradictory reports as to whether he was recording and mixing at The Hit Factory or the nearby Record Plant on the day he was murdered. Most publications give the Record Plant as the location, as do producer Jack Douglas and others who were with Lennon that day. However, Keith Badman, not an eyewitness, writes in his book The Beatles: After the Break-up, 1970–2000 that Lennon had been at The Hit Factory the night of his murder. He also writes that Lennon had been at the studio the previous few days working on and mixing tracks for Yoko Ono.

Notable recordings

Albums

Graceland by Paul Simon 1986
Songs in the Key of Life by Stevie Wonder 1976 
Double Fantasy by John Lennon and Yoko Ono 1980
Emotional Rescue by The Rolling Stones 1980
Born in the U.S.A. by Bruce Springsteen 1984
Mary by Mary J. Blige 1999
Fear of Music by Talking Heads 1979
It Was Written by Nas 1996
Dangerously In Love by Beyoncé 2003
Milk and Honey by John Lennon and Yoko Ono 1984
This Is Me... Then by Jennifer Lopez 2002
Flashpoint by The Rolling Stones 1991
Scarface by Giorgio Moroder 1983
Hell Freezes Over by Eagles in 1994
River of Dreams by Billy Joel 1993
Ready to Die by The Notorious B.I.G. 1994 
Pop by U2 1997
Octavarium by Dream Theater 2005
Under a Blood Red Sky by U2 1983
Chimes of Freedom by Bruce Springsteen 1988
Daydream by Mariah Carey 1995
Vol. 2... Hard Knock Life by Jay-Z 1998
Falling Into You by Celine Dion 1996
The Bodyguard by Whitney Houston 1992
Titanic: Music from the Motion Picture 1997
We Live Here by Pat Metheny Group 1995
Space Jam 1996
No Strings Attached by NSYNC 2000
Nellyville by Nelly 2002
Duets by Frank Sinatra 1993
Bat Out Of Hell by Meat Loaf 1977
Foreigner by Foreigner 1977
Hands All Over (album) by Maroon 5 2010
Unforgettable... with Love by Natalie Cole 1991
True Colors by Cyndi Lauper 1986
HIStory: Past, Present and Future, Book I by Michael Jackson 1995
Dangerous by Michael Jackson 1991
CrazySexyCool by TLC 1994
Celebrity by NSYNC 2001
What's the 411? by Mary J. Blige 1992
Merry Christmas by Mariah Carey 1994
Riptide by Robert Palmer 1985
Big Willie Style by Will Smith 1997
Swept Away by Diana Ross 1984
Forever by Kool & the Gang 1986
Machismo by Cameo 1988
Live at the Hollywood Palladium, December 15, 1988 by Keith Richards 1988
Green by R.E.M. 1988
Rhythm of Love by Anita Baker 1994
Down with the King by Run-DMC 1993
Live and Sleazy by Village People 1979
Britney by Britney Spears 2001
Main Offender by Keith Richards 1993
I Am... by Nas 1999
Valotte by Julian Lennon 1984
Greatest Hits by Lenny Kravitz 2000
Dream of Life by Patti Smith 1988
Boys and Girls by Bryan Ferry 1985
More Than You Think You Are by Matchbox Twenty 2002
Up by R.E.M. 1998
The Velvet Rope by Janet Jackson 1997
X&Y by Coldplay 2005
Songs by Luther Vandross 1994
Time, Love & Tenderness by Michael Bolton 1991
A Very Special Christmas by Various Artists 1987
Back to the Future Soundtrack 1986 
Supernatural by Santana 1999
Night Music by Joe Jackson 1994
Men Without Women by Little Steven and the Disciples of Soul 1982
Rocky IV Soundtrack 1985
Sacred Love by Sting 2003
Mariah Carey by Mariah Carey 1990
Foreign Affair by Tina Turner 1989
The 30th Anniversary Concert Celebration by Bob Dylan 1993
Tunnel of Love by Bruce Springsteen 1987
Whitney by Whitney Houston 1987
Black Tie White Noise by David Bowie 1993
Bedtime Stories by Madonna 1994
Survivor by Destiny's Child 2001
Back to Broadway by Barbra Streisand 1993
Sogno by Andrea Bocelli 1999
Love Deluxe by Sade 1992
You Can Dance by Madonna 1987
Hollywood's Bleeding by Post Malone 2019
Astroworld by Travis Scott 2018
Damn by Kendrick Lamar 2017
Living In A Ghost Town by The Rolling Stones 2020
Stoney by Post Malone 2016
The Life of Pablo by Kanye West 2016
Crosseyed Heart by Keith Richards 2015
Brightest Blue by Ellie Goulding 2020
Born This Way by Lady Gaga 2011
21 by Adele 2012
4 by Beyoncé 2011
My World 2.0 by Justin Bieber 2010
Beauty Behind The Madness by The Weeknd 2015
Clapton by Eric Clapton 2010
Blonde by Frank Ocean 2016
Queen by Nicki Minaj 2018
Battle Born by the Killers 2012
Bridges by Josh Groban 2018
Uptown Special by Mark Ronson2015
Yeezus by Kanye West 2013
Prism by Katy Perry
Threads by Sheryl Crow 2019
Play On by Carrie Underwood 2009
Luv Is Rage 2 by Lil Uzi Vert 2017
A Town Called Paradise by Tiesto 2014
Cloud Nine by Kygo 2016
At.Long.Last.A$AP by A$AP Rocky 2015
Harmony by Josh Groban 2020
The Blessed Unrest by Sara Bareilles 2013
async by Ryuichi Sakamoto 2017
Memoirs of an Imperfect Angel by Mariah Carey 2009
Stronger With Each Tear by Mary J. Blige 2009
Life Is Good by Nas 2012
Vibras by J Balvin 2018
Rêvolution by IAM 2017
Title by Meghan Trainor 2015
The Element of Freedom by Alicia Keys 2009
Native by OneRepublic 2013
Rebirth by Lil Wayne 2010
Rated R by Rihanna 2009
Love in the Future by John Legend 2014
Girl by Pharrell Williams 2014
This House Is Not for Sale by Bon Jovi 2016
Unvarnished by Joan Jett and the Blackhearts 2013
Divinely Uninspired To A Hellish Extent by Lewis Capaldi 2019
2020 by Bon Jovi 2020
Invasion of Privacy by Cardi B 2018
Stranger Songs by Ingrid Michaelson 2019
Tha Carter V by Lil Wayne 2018
My Beautiful Dark Twisted Fantasy by Kanye West 2010
Seal the Deal & Let's Boogie by Volbeat 2016
Anti by Rihanna 2016
Before I Self Destruct by 50 Cent 2009
MDNA by Madonna 2012
Merry Christmas II You by Mariah Carey 2010
I Am... Sasha Fierce by Beyoncé 2009
Oasis by J. Balvin and Bad Bunny 2019
The Beginning by The Black Eyed Peas 2010
No Mercy by T.I. 2010
I Decided by Big Sean 2017
Christmas by Michael Buble 2011
Cradlesong by Rob Thomas 2009
Mind of Mine by Zayn 2016
The Blues Is Alive and Well by Buddy Guy 2018
Swing Symphony by Wynton Marsalis 2019
Soulbook by Rod Stewart 2009
Light by Matisyahu 2009
Everybody by Logic 2017
Malice N Wonderland by Snoop Dogg 2009
Suga by Megan Thee Stallion 2020
I Look To You by Whitney Houston 2009
Sweetener by Ariana Grande 2018
Dark Lane Demo Tapes by Drake 2020
The Revenant Soundtrack 2016
Beauty and the Beast Soundtrack 2017
Mary Poppins Returns Soundtrack 2018
Despicable Me: Original Motion Picture Soundtrack Soundtrack 2010
Over The Moon Soundtrack 2020
Hello Dolly! (Bette Midler) Broadway Cast Recording 2017
Creed Soundtrack 2015
Minamata Soundtrack 2020
Black Mirror Smithereens Soundtrack by Ryuichi Sakamoto 2019
Bad Reputation Soundtrack 2018
Talk Is Cheap by Keith Richards 1988
Steel Wheels by The Rolling Stones 1989
Undercover by The Rolling Stones 1983
Live/1975-85 by Bruce Springsteen & The E Street Band 1986
Nine Lives by Aerosmith 1997
August by Eric Clapton 1986
Kamakiriad by Donald Fagan 1993
On The 6 by Jennifer Lopez 1999
Storm Front by Billy Joel 1989
Music by Madonna 2000
Whiplash Smile by Billy Idol 1986
Freedom by Neil Young 1989
Rhythm of the Saints by Paul Simon 1990
Let's Talk About Love by Celine Dion 1997
Invincible by Michael Jackson 2001
Romances by Luis Miguel 1997
Never Let Me Go by Luther Vandross 1993
Butterfly by Mariah Carey 1997
Babylon and On by Squeeze 1987
You're the One by Paul Simon 2000
Goddess in the Doorway by Mick Jagger 2001
Brian Wilson by Brian Wilson 1988
Animalize by Kiss 1984
Long After Dark by Tom Petty and the Heartbreakers 1982
Voices by Hall & Oates 1980
Lick It Up by Kiss 1983
7800° Fahrenheit by Bon Jovi 1985
State of Confusion by the Kinks 1983
Across the Borderline by Willie Nelson 1993
Your Filthy Little Mouth by David Lee Roth 1994
Come Out and Play by Twisted Sister 1985
Up Your Alley by Joan Jett and The Blackhearts 1988
Steppin' Out by Tony Bennett 1994
Forty Licks by The Rolling Stones 2002
Ray of Light by Madonna 1998
Paul Simon's Concert in the Park by Paul Simon 1991
John Lennon Anthology by John Lennon 1998
Taste of Chocolate by Big Daddy Kane 1990
Bad by Michael Jackson 1987
Greatest Hits by Bruce Springsteen 1995
Greatest Hits – Volume I & Volume II by Billy Joel
Heavy Nova by Robert Palmer 1987
My Life by Mary J. Blige 1994
My Love Is Your Love by Whitney Houston 1998
The Rolling Stones Rock and Roll Circus by The Rolling Stones 1996
Share My World by Mary J. Blige 1997
Still Waters by Bee Gees 1997
Diary of a Mad Band by Jodeci 1993
Temple of Low Men by Crowded House 1998
Blood on the Dance Floor: HIStory in the Mix by Michael Jackson 1997
A Night to Remember by Cyndi Lauper 1989
Ooh Yeah! by Hall & Oates 1988
I'm in You by Peter Frampton 1976
Big Science by Laurie Anderson 1982
Sons of Soul by Tony! Toni! Tone! 1993
I Am... by Nas 1999
Groove Approved by Paul Carrack 1989
The Hunter by Blondie 1982
Special by Jimmy Cliff 1982
True Blue by Madonna 1986
Shaka Zulu by Ladysmith Black Mambazo 1987
Power of Love by Luther Vandross 1991
Mr. Happy Go Lucky by John Mellencamp 1996
Soul Searchin' by Glenn Frey 1988
18 Tracks by Bruce Springsteen 1999
Uh-Oh by David Byrne 1992
Station to Station by David Bowie 1976
Agent Provocateur  by Foreigner 1984
It's a Game by Bay City Rollers 1977

References

External links

 

Recording studios in Manhattan
1975 establishments in New York City
2005 disestablishments in New York (state)
Midtown Manhattan